Khan Qırım Giray (1717–1769) was one of the most influential rulers of the Crimean Khanate. He was the patron of the Bakhchisaray Fountain and many Mosques throughout Crimea, and is also known to have extended the Bakhchisaray Palace.

Reign
Qırım Giray's first reign lasted (1758–1764), he gathered a large army in Căușeni and prepared to invade Poland after some Tatar merchants were robbed, some of his forces managed to raid and pillage a few important Polish strongholds. Poland agreed to pay indemnity to him and the conflict ended.

Qırım Giray intended to wage war against Stanisław August Poniatowski, who was placed as ruler of Poland by Catherine II but was halted by the Ottoman Empire and was deposed by his nephew Selim III Giray, but regained power after the reign of Maqsud Giray.

Qırım Giray's second reign lasted from (1768–1769), he once again gathered a large army in Căușeni consisting of Tatars, Ottomans and Polish allies and invaded the Russian held territories in modern-day Ukraine.

Bakhchisaray Fountain

In 1764 Khan Qırım Girai commissioned the fountain master Omer the Persian to construct the Bakhchisaray Fountain. The Bakhchisaray Fountain or Fountain of Tears is a real case of life imitating art. The fountain is known as the embodiment of love of one of the last Crimean Khans, Khan Qırım Girai for his young wife, and his grief after her early death. The Khan was said to have fallen in love with this Polish girl in his harem named Maria Potoçka. Despite his battle-hardened harshness, he was grievous and wept when she died, astonishing all those who knew him. He commissioned a marble fountain to be made, so that the rock would weep, like him, forever.

The tradition of building such Salsabil fountain is well established in Islamic architecture, especially in the cities of Baghdad and Damascus. Salsabil fountains often involved several basins, and sometimes channels that distributed water through basins and pools.

Inscribed in gold above the Fountain of Tears is a verse of Surah 76 of the Quran, which names, among the benefits the righteous will enjoy including a spring, called "Salsabil". According to many Muslim scholars, the word Salsabil literally means "seek the way". It refers to a particular spring in heaven, and it also contains allusions to such concepts as "nectar," "smooth" and "easy on the throat". The Arabic word Sabil commonly refers to public fountains built for philanthropic purposes to provide water for wayfarers.

See also
Crimean Khanate

References

1769 deaths
Crimean Khans
18th-century rulers in Europe
Year of birth unknown